Laagland   is a 1996 Dutch TV film directed by Yolanda Entius.

Cast
Marcel Musters	... 	Jan
Lineke Rijxman	... 	Ellen
Tom Jansen	... 	Simon
Finn Poncin	... 	Jos
Marre van den Brand	... 	Meisje
Yolanda Entius	... 	Jetteke
Mark Rietman	... 	Leo
Oda Spelbos	... 	Vriendin
Myra de Vries	... 	Vriendin
Mees Jongema	... 	Vriendin (as Mijs Heesen)
Ella Snoep	... 	Buurvrouw

External links 
 

Dutch television films
1996 films
1990s Dutch-language films